Espiritu Santo Airport  is an airstrip serving the village of Espiritu Santo in Usulután Department, El Salvador. The runway is on a point in the Bahia de Jiquilisco.

See also

Transport in El Salvador
List of airports in El Salvador

References

External links
 OpenStreetMap - Espiritu Santo
 HERE/Nokia - Espiritu Santo
 FallingRain - Espiritu Santo

Airports in El Salvador